Chauvet may refer to:

Chauvet Cave, a pre-historic site with paleolithic cave art 
Lac Chauvet, a lake in France
C.H. Chauvet, a French aircraft constructor; see List of aircraft (Cd–Cn)

Persons
Charles-Alexis Chauvet (1837–1871), French organist and composer
Géraldine Chauvet, French operatic mezzo-soprano
Guy Chauvet (1933–2007), French tenor
Jules Chauvet (1907-1989), French winemaker

Patricia Chauvet (born 1967), French alpine skier
Pierre Chauvet (cross-country skier), French cross-country skier, two-time Kilomètre vertical de Fully winner
Pierre Chauvet (racing driver), pseudonym of Friedrich Glatz (1943–2002), Austrian racing driver
Stéphen Chauvet (1885–1950), French physician and author of Easter Island and Its Mysteries
Vincent Chauvet (born 1987), French activist and politician